Jarron Thomas Collins (born December 2, 1978) is an American professional basketball coach and former player who is an assistant coach for the New Orleans Pelicans of the National Basketball Association (NBA). He was selected in the second round of the 2001 NBA draft by the Utah Jazz, and played 10 seasons in the NBA. He has a twin brother, Jason, who also played in the league.

High school career
Jarron Collins was born in Northridge, California. He and his twin brother Jason, who also became an NBA player, graduated from Harvard-Westlake School in Los Angeles, California. Also on the team was actor Jason Segel, who starred in a slam dunk contest after Collins deferred to allow his teammate to participate.

Collins shot 72 percent from the floor and averaged 13.8 points and 9.2 rebounds during his senior year in high school.

College career
Collins attended Stanford University, where he was a two-time All-American and finished his Stanford career in the top ten all time in four career categories: rebounds, blocked shots, field-goal percentage and games played.

He was also recruited by UCLA, where he, his brother, and Earl Watson were the guests at the recruiting dinner that led to the firing of Jim Harrick at UCLA.

NBA career

Collins was selected by the Utah Jazz in the second round of the 2001 NBA Draft and played eight seasons with the Jazz until becoming a free agent following the 2009 season.

Collins spent the 2009 NBA preseason with the Portland Trail Blazers. He was waived by Portland, but then claimed off waivers by the Phoenix Suns.

Collins later joined the Los Angeles Clippers, signing a 10-day contract on January 7, 2011. He renewed his tenure, later signing another 10-day contract on January 17, 2011. On March 1, 2011, he signed a 10-day contract with the Portland Trail Blazers, and was released after finishing a second ten-day contract. That second 10-day contract ended up being Collins' final days in the NBA, as his final game was on March 17, 2011 in a 111 - 70 win over the Cleveland Cavaliers. In his final game, Collins played for 4 minutes and recorded no stats.

He retired from basketball after the season.

Post-playing career
In 2013, he was working for the Los Angeles Clippers as a scout.

He later worked as a college basketball analyst for Pac-12 Networks.

On July 3, 2014, Collins joined Steve Kerr's staff as a player development coach for the Golden State Warriors. Collins won his first championship when the Warriors defeated the Cleveland Cavaliers in the 2015 NBA Finals.

On July 29, 2015, he was promoted to assistant coach by the Warriors.

Collins won his second championship in three years when the Warriors defeated the Cleveland Cavaliers in the 2017 NBA Finals.

Collins won his third championship in four years when the Warriors defeated the Cleveland Cavaliers in the 2018 NBA Finals.

In June 2021, Collins and the Warriors mutually agreed to part ways.

On August 4, 2021, Collins was hired as assistant coach by the New Orleans Pelicans.

NBA career statistics

Regular season

|-
| style="text-align:left;"|
| style="text-align:left;"|Utah
| 70 || 68 || 20.6 || .461 || .000 || .740 || 4.2 || .8 || .4 || .3 || 6.4
|-
| style="text-align:left;"|
| style="text-align:left;"|Utah
| 22 || 7 || 19.1 || .442 || .000 || .710 || 2.7 || .6 || .2 || .3 || 5.5
|-
| style="text-align:left;"|
| style="text-align:left;"|Utah
| 81 || 31 || 21.4 || .498 || .000 || .718 || 3.9 || 1.0 || .3 || .2 || 6.0
|-
| style="text-align:left;"|
| style="text-align:left;"|Utah
| 50 || 38 || 19.2 || .414 || .000 || .697 || 3.3 || 1.2 || .2 || .1 || 4.3
|-
| style="text-align:left;"|
| style="text-align:left;"|Utah
| 79 || 41 || 21.9 || .461 ||  || .717 || 4.2 || 1.2 || .5 || .3 || 5.3
|-
| style="text-align:left;"|
| style="text-align:left;"|Utah
| 82 || 9 || 11.1 || .441 ||  || .651 || 2.1 || .7 || .2 || .1 || 2.5
|-
| style="text-align:left;"|
| style="text-align:left;"|Utah
| 70 || 9 || 10.0 || .439 || .000 || .622 || 1.7 || .5 || .1 || .1 || 1.7
|-
| style="text-align:left;"|
| style="text-align:left;"|Utah
| 26 || 3 || 7.7 || .457 ||  || .727 || 1.4 || .3 || .1 || .0 || 1.5
|-
| style="text-align:left;"|
| style="text-align:left;"|Phoenix
| 34 || 10 || 7.7 || .387 ||  || .400 || 1.8 || .2 || .1 || .1 || 1.0
|-
| style="text-align:left;"|
| style="text-align:left;"|L.A. Clippers
| 23 || 0 || 6.8 || .333 ||  || .700 || .7 || .0 || .2 || .0 || .7
|-
| style="text-align:left;"|
| style="text-align:left;"|Portland
| 5 || 0 || 4.8 || .167 ||  ||  || 1.4 || .2 || .0 || .0 || .4
|- class="sortbottom"
| style="text-align:center;" colspan="2"|Career
| 542 || 216 || 15.8 || .455 || .000 || .699 || 2.9 || .8 || .3 || .2 || 3.9

Playoffs

|-
| style="text-align:left;"|2002
| style="text-align:left;"|Utah
| 4 || 4 || 11.8 || .556 ||  || 1.000 || 1.8 || .0 || .0 || .0 || 5.5
|-
| style="text-align:left;"|2007
| style="text-align:left;"|Utah
| 13 || 0 || 8.5 || .333 ||  || .529 || 1.5 || .4 || .3 || .0 || 1.2
|-
| style="text-align:left;"|2008
| style="text-align:left;"|Utah
| 5 || 0 || 4.0 || .000 ||  ||  || 1.2 || .2 || .2 || .2 || .0
|-
| style="text-align:left;"|2009
| style="text-align:left;"|Utah
| 3 || 3 || 11.7 || .200 ||  || .750 || 3.3 || .3 || .3 || .0 || 2.7
|-
| style="text-align:left;"|2010
| style="text-align:left;"|Phoenix
| 11 || 10 || 10.5 || .333 ||  || 1.000 || 1.5 || .0 || .1 || .1 || 1.1
|- class="sortbottom"
| style="text-align:center;" colspan="2"|Career
| 35 || 17 || 9.3 || .380 ||  || .655 || 1.7 || .2 || .2 || .1 || 1.6

References

External links

1978 births
Living people
African-American basketball players
American men's basketball players
Basketball coaches from California
Basketball players from Los Angeles
Centers (basketball)
Golden State Warriors assistant coaches
Harvard-Westlake School alumni
Identical twins
Los Angeles Clippers players
McDonald's High School All-Americans
Parade High School All-Americans (boys' basketball)
People from Northridge, Los Angeles
Phoenix Suns players
Portland Trail Blazers players
Stanford Cardinal men's basketball players
American twins
Twin sportspeople
Utah Jazz draft picks
Utah Jazz players
21st-century African-American sportspeople
20th-century African-American sportspeople